The Russian Catholic Apostolic Exarchate of Harbin (or Harbin 哈爾濱 of the Russians) is a dormant apostolic exarchate of the Russian Byzantine Catholic Church based in the city of Harbin in China.  The cathedra of the apostolic exarchate was in the Cathedral of St. Vladimir in Harbin, which is now in ruins. The apostolic exarchate also had churches in Shanghai and Beijing.

From the 1890s to the 1930s Harbin attracted Russian immigrants, including railway workers and later white émigrés fleeing the Revolution and Civil War and the rise of Stalin.   Harbin Russians included Russian Orthodox, Polish Latin Catholic, and Jewish congregations. In 1926 Ivan Koronin's parish converted from Orthodox to Catholic. Although most went back after Koronin's death, about 40 remained to form the nucleus of the Eastern Catholic congregation. On 20 May 1928 the Pontifical Commission for Russia issued the decree Fidelium Russorum establishing an ordinariate at Harbin to cater for Russians of the Byzantine Rite, and "all Catholics of the Oriental Rites", in China. It was later transformed into an apostolic exarchate. Ordinariates and apostolic exarchates are exempt jurisdictions, not part of any ecclesiastical province but rather directly subject to the Holy See, in Harbin's case through the Congregation for the Oriental Churches as successor to the Pontifical Commission for Russia. The ordinary or apostolic exarch would be from the Congregation of Marian Fathers of the Immaculate Conception, a Polish Latin Catholic order.  In 1939 Andrzej Cikoto obtained Pius XII's consent for a Byzantine Rite branch of the Marian Fathers. In the Chinese Communist Revolution, the Russian Catholic clergy were arrested and deported to the Soviet Union.  The apostolic exarchate has had no ordinary since 1952 and is in fact discontinued till further papal notice. Russian Catholic communities in Melbourne, New York, Buenos Aires, and São Paulo have Harbin heritage.

References

Sources

Citations

External links
 Lyceum St. Nicholas, Harbin, 1929-1949 from the archived website of The Society of St. John Chrysostom of Ayatriada Rum Katoliki Kilise

Russian Greek Catholic Church
Apostolic exarchates
Eastern Catholic dioceses
1928 establishments in China
History of Harbin
Organizations based in Harbin
History of Christianity in China
Chinese people of Russian descent
Roman Catholic dioceses in China
Christian organizations established in 1928